Otto Stuppacher (3 March 1947 – 13 August 2001) was a racing driver from Vienna, Austria. He was refused entry to the 1976 Austrian Grand Prix, along with teammate Karl Oppitzhauser, despite trying to raise a petition from the other teams.

At the 1976 Italian Grand Prix he failed to qualify by a considerable margin, but subsequently he was promoted up the order when three other cars had their times disallowed due to fuel irregularities.  Unfortunately, Stuppacher had already left the circuit and returned home, and was unable to get back to the circuit in time to race.  The three demoted runners were eventually re-admitted after the withdrawal of Stuppacher, Arturo Merzario, and Guy Edwards.

Stuppacher failed to qualify at his other two attempts in 1976, the 1976 Canadian Grand Prix and the 1976 USA East Grand Prix, the latter seeing him over 27 seconds off the time of pole-sitter James Hunt. To date, this gap between pole-position time and slowest time during qualifying in an official Formula One race is a record that still stands today.

It is not clear how much racing Stuppacher did after 1976, and very little is known of him until he was found dead in his Vienna flat in 2001.

He has a sister who raced in harness racing as Elisabeth Stuppacher, who was the Austrian champion from 1993 to 2000.

Complete Formula One World Championship participations
(key)

External links
 Biography at F1 Rejects

References

Austrian racing drivers
Austrian Formula One drivers
1947 births
2001 deaths
Sportspeople from Vienna
24 Hours of Le Mans drivers
World Sportscar Championship drivers